Patricia Babcock-McGraw is a sportswriter for the Daily Herald, a color analyst/sideline reporter for the Chicago Sky, and a women's college basketball analyst for the Big Ten Network.

She was named Indiana Miss Basketball during her senior year in high school (in 1990) and was a three-time all-state selection. She ended her high school career with 2,199 points, the second all-time leading scorer in state history. Her career high-school averages were 26.8 points, 13.2 rebounds, and 3.6 blocks per game. She graduated from Northwestern University among career leaders in points (1,353), rebounds (813) and FG% (.546). She was a two time all-Big Ten and two-time academic All-Big Ten selection.

She was inducted into the Indiana Sports Hall of Fame in 2017.

References

American sportswriters
Northwestern Wildcats women's basketball players
Women's National Basketball Association announcers
Women's college basketball announcers in the United States
Living people
Year of birth missing (living people)
American women sportswriters